German submarine U-133 was a Type VIIC U-boat built for Nazi Germany's Kriegsmarine for service during World War II. She was laid down on 21 August 1940 by Vegesacker Werft, Bremen-Vegesack as yard number 12, launched on 28 April 1941 and commissioned on 5 July that year. U-133 sank with all hands lost after striking a mine off Aegina island Greece on 14 March 1942. In 1986 the professional divers Efstáthios "Státhis" Baramátis and Theófilos Klímis spotted by chance a wreck at a depth of 74 meters that was identified as an unknown German submarine. Almost ten years later, in the mid-90s, the same wreck was further identified by Greek divers as the U-133.

Design
German Type VIIC submarines were preceded by the shorter Type VIIB submarines. U-113 had a displacement of  when at the surface and  while submerged. She had two shafts and two  propellers.

U-113 was fitted with five  torpedo tubes (four fitted at the bow and one at the stern), fourteen torpedoes, one  SK C/35 naval gun, 220 rounds, and a  C/30 anti-aircraft gun. The boat had a complement of between forty-four and sixty.

Summary of raiding history

References

Notes

Citations

Bibliography

External links

 Aristotelis Zervoudis

German Type VIIC submarines
World War II submarines of Germany
U-boats sunk by mines
U-boats commissioned in 1941
U-boats sunk in 1942
1941 ships
World War II shipwrecks in the Aegean Sea
Ships built in Bremen (state)
Ships lost with all hands
Maritime incidents in March 1942
Shipwrecks of Greece